Hans Heinrich Eduard Vieweg (15 July 1797, Berlin - 1 December 1869, Braunschweig) was a German publisher; the owner of Vieweg Verlag.

Biography 
He was born to the publisher and bookseller, Friedrich Vieweg. When his family moved to Braunschweig, in 1799, he came under the influence of his grandfather, the educator and publisher,  Joachim Heinrich Campe. He attended grammar school there, but joined the Hussar regiment in 1813, and was promoted to Sergeant the following year. After participating in several campaigns, he was placed on leave with a foot ailment, possibly caused by poor riding habits, and was discharged in 1815.

After some initial training at his father's company, from 1821 to 1823 he worked for Hoffmann und Campe, operated by his uncle,  in Hamburg. After that, he visited England and France where, in Paris, he befriended the chemist, and his future business partner, Justus von Liebig. In 1825, he married a distant cousin, Luise Campe; daughter of the Leipzig financier, Heinrich Wilhelm Campe (1771-1862). 

That same year, he became a partner in his father's publishing house, bringing in the latest presses and equipment, which he had discovered while traveling. He also made and patented several improvements. With his brother Karl, a farmer, he founded his own paper company. Most of the works he chose to publish were of a scientific nature. He became the owner of the firm when his father died in 1835.

Politically, he was a moderate Liberal; supporting the idea of a unified Germany, under the leadership of Prussia. It was issued until 1840, when the increasing censorship forced him to discontinue it. This lasted until 1866, when Prussia annexed Schleswig-Holstein after the Seven Weeks' War, and Vieweg found his support for Prussia waning.

He was also involved in local politics; serving on the city council (1839–1855) and in the Landtag (1848–1867).

In October 1866, he suffered a stroke and remained bedridden until his death in 1869. Vieweg Verlag passed to his only son, .

References

Further reading 
 Kai Drewes: "Die Unüberwindbarkeit der Zensur. Ein unbekannter Brief des Braunschweiger Verlegers Eduard Vieweg an Karl Marx aus dem Jahr 1846". In: Archiv für Geschichte des Buchwesens. Vol. 66, Walter de Gruyter, Berlin 2011, pps. 155–164 (Online)
 Gabriele Henkel: "Vieweg, Hans Heinrich Eduard". In: Horst-Rüdiger Jarck, Günter Scheel (Eds.): Braunschweigisches Biographisches Lexikon. 19. und 20. Jahrhundert. Hahnsche Buchhandlung, Hannover 1996, pg.629
 Edgar Rosen: "Eduard Vieweg – Leben und Werk". In: Werner Pöls, Klaus Erich Pollmann (Eds.): Moderne Braunschweigische Geschichte. Olms, Hildesheim 1982, pps. 95–107
 

1797 births
1869 deaths
German publishers (people)
German newspaper publishers (people)
People from Berlin